= Issobell Young =

Issobell Young (c. 1565 – February 1629) was a wife of a tenant farmer residing in the village of East Barns in the parish of Dunbar, Lothian, Scotland. She was tried, strangled, and burned at the stake at Castle Hill, Edinburgh for practising witchcraft.

== Background ==
Issobell Young married George Smith, a portioner, who occupied a section of land for farming that is part of a larger estate. Issobell sold crops, cared for animals, raised four children, and managed the home. The family lived in a large household that included land and livestock, employing over fifteen members of staff to assist with farming crops and animals.

Issobell's neighbours accused her of often expressing "patterns of verbal and sometimes physical aggression." Residents of East Barns believed she engaged in witchcraft for personal gain to secure higher status in the community by thrusting her fellow neighbours into misfortune, despair, and poverty. She rejected the claims, insisting that she was an "honest woman," and that any misfortune that plagued her neighbours was solely from their own doing, idleness, or God's condemnation. She denied ever practising witchcraft and instead claimed that the conflicts between her neighbours and herself were of an ordinary nature. Yet, George Smith, her husband, testified against her in 1624 for "attempting to kill him with magic after quarrelling about an unsavoury house guest."

Furthermore, the historical record indicates that "forty-five of her neighbours and relatives, including her husband, testified against her, telling a story that unfolded over four decades." Her husband testified against her; one son defended her. Despite her insistence on being a good, moral Christian woman that would not hurt or ill-wish her neighbours, she was found unanimously guilty on only one charge - witchcraft.

She was sentenced to death at Castle Hill, Edinburgh, where she was strangled and burned at the stake (c. February 1629).
